Kolah Jub-e Olya (also Romanized as Kolah Jūb-e ‘Olyā; also known as Kolah Jūb) is a village in Dinavar Rural District, Dinavar District, Sahneh County, Kermanshah Province, Iran. At the 2006 census, its population was 100, in 30 families.

References 

Populated places in Sahneh County